The White Rock Wildlife Management Area (WMA) was designated in 1976 as  of protected area within the boundaries of the Ozark National Forest. The WMA is owned by the U. S. Forest Service and managed under the provisions of a Memorandum of Understanding by the Arkansas Game and Fish Commission, and is situated in the Boston Mountains of Northwest Arkansas.

Description

The Mulberry River runs through the southern part of the WMA and there are four major lakes; Shores Lake, Horsehead Lake, Lake Ft Smith and Lake Shepherd Springs. Fishing, hunting, trapping, and recreational activities such as canoeing, hiking, and observing fauna and viewing flora . Wildlife includes squirrels, deer, wild turkeys, black bears and fur-bearers. There are camping, picnic and swimming areas throughout the WMA. There are six districts in the WMA.

The Pig Trail Scenic Byway runs from Brashears through Cass and south towards Interstate 49. Cass was an old sawmill town from 1915 to 1926 when the Black Mountain and Eastern Railroad ran from Combs to Cass.

Districts

Pleasant Hill Ranger District
Horsehead Lake Recreation Area
Ozone Recreation Area
Pleasant Hill Shooting Range
Redding Campground
Wolf Pen
Mt. Magazine Ranger District 

Cove Lake Recreation Area
Mount Magazine Complex
Spring Lake
Big Piney Ranger District 

Bayou Bluff
Brock Creek
Haw Creek Falls
Long Pool Recreation Area
Rotary Ann Roadside Rest Area
East Fork Wilderness
Boston Mountain Ranger District 

Lake Wedington
Natural Dam Picnic Area
Gray's Spring
Shores Lake Recreation Area  in Franklin County.

White Rock Mountain
Sylamore Ranger District 
Barkshed Campground
Gunner Pool Campground
Blanchard Springs Recreation Area and Campground
Sylamore Shooting Range
Leatherwood Wilderness
Syllamore Mountain Bike Trail
Blanchard Springs Caverns 
St. Francis Ranger District 
Bear Creek Lake
Storm Creek Lake

Communities
Bidville

References

Wildlife management areas of Arkansas

 Protected areas of Crawford County, Arkansas
 Protected areas of Franklin County, Arkansas
 Protected areas of Johnson County, Arkansas
 Protected areas of Madison County, Arkansas
 Protected areas of Newton County, Arkansas

 

 Protected areas of Washington County, Arkansas

 Protected areas established in 1976